The 37th FAMAS Awards Ceremony presented by the Filipino Academy of Movie Arts and Sciences, honored the best in Filipino film for 1988.

For the first time in the history of FAMAS, the Best Picture was divided into three categories. Best Picture, Best Comedy Picture and Best Action Picture. Ibulong Mo sa Diyos won for the drama category, Enteng the Dragon for comedy and Chinatown: Sa Kuko ng Dragon for Action. On the other hand, Vilma Santos won her fifth Famas Best Actress Award.

Awards

Major
Winners are listed first and highlighted with boldface.

Special awardee

References

External links
FAMAS Awards 

FAMAS Award
FAMAS
FAMAS